Kakanur is a village situated in Kurnool district near Nandyal and comes under the mandal of Bandi Atmakur.

Villages in Kurnool district